Phyllonorycter sibirica is a moth of the family Gracillariidae. It is known from the Russian Far East.

The larvae feed on Populus species. They mine the leaves of their host plant.

References

sibirica
Moths of Asia
Moths described in 2001